The Ministry of Integration and Gender Equality was a ministry of the Government Offices of Sweden. Its areas of responsibility included consumer affairs, democracy issues, gender equality, human rights, integration issues, metropolitan affairs, minority issues, non-governmental organizations and youth policy. The only minister to head the ministry was Nyamko Sabuni who served as Minister for Gender Equality and as Minister for Integration. She was careful to publicly point out that she is an equalist and not a feminist, not having any group based on gender, race, age, religion or other typical discrimination ground as focus and angle above others in her equality work. In Swedish the role (Jämställdhetsminister) is more exactly translated into called Equality Minister.

The ministry offices were located at Fredsgatan 8 in central Stockholm.

The ministry was dissolved following the 2010 general election with gender equality moving to the Ministry of Education and Research and integration moving to the Ministry of Employment.

History 
The ministry was created on January 1, 2007, after a decision by the new government that took office on October 6, 2006. Previously these its areas of responsibilities were handled by the Ministry of Justice and the Ministry for Foreign Affairs respectively.

Government agencies 
The Ministry of Integration and Gender Equality was principal for the following government agencies:

Integration and Gender Equality
Sweden
Sweden
Ministries established in 2007
Gender in Sweden